The following highways are numbered 91:

International
 European route E91

Australia
 Cairns Western Arterial Road
 Summerland Way

Brasil
SP-91, state highway in Sao Paulo

Canada
 British Columbia Highway 91
 British Columbia Highway 91A
 Newfoundland and Labrador Route 91

China
  G91 Expressway

Iran
 Road 91

Israel
 Highway 91 (Israel)

Italy
 Autostrada A91

Greece
Greek National Road 91

Korea, South
National Route 91

United States
 Interstate 91
 U.S. Route 91
 Alabama State Route 91
 Arkansas Highway 91
 California State Route 91
 Colorado State Highway 91
 Florida State Road 91 (unsigned designation for Florida's Turnpike)
 Georgia State Route 91
 Georgia State Route 91W (former)
 Illinois Route 91
 Iowa Highway 91
 Kentucky Route 91
 Louisiana Highway 91
 Louisiana State Route 91 (former)
 Maine State Route 91
 Maryland Route 91
Maryland Route 91A (former)
 M-91 (Michigan highway)
 Minnesota State Highway 91
 County Road 91 (St. Louis County, Minnesota)
 Missouri Route 91
 Nebraska Highway 91
 Nebraska Link 91D
 Nebraska Spur 91A
 Nebraska Spur 91B
 Nevada State Route 91 (1959) (former)
 New Jersey Route 91
 County Route 91 (Bergen County, New Jersey)
 New Mexico State Road 91
 New York State Route 91
 County Route 91 (Herkimer County, New York)
 County Route 91 (Monroe County, New York)
 County Route 91 (Niagara County, New York)
 County Route 91 (Oneida County, New York)
 County Route 91 (Onondaga County, New York)
 County Route 91 (Rensselaer County, New York)
 County Route 91 (Saratoga County, New York)
 County Route 91 (Schenectady County, New York)
 County Route 91 (Suffolk County, New York)
 County Route 91 (Sullivan County, New York)
 North Carolina Highway 91
 North Dakota Highway 91
 Ohio State Route 91
 Oklahoma State Highway 91
 Pennsylvania Route 91 (former)
 Rhode Island Route 91
 Tennessee State Route 91
 Texas State Highway 91
 Texas State Highway Spur 91
 Farm to Market Road 91
 Utah State Route 91 (former)
 Virginia State Route 91
 Wisconsin Highway 91
 Wyoming Highway 91

Vietnam 
 National Road 91 (Vietnam)

See also
A91 road